A Tumble Bug is an amusement park ride with a circular track.

The ride has a central axis and a circular track. The track has changes in elevation in it, and the cars, each attached by a rod to a central pivot attachment point and connected together, are propelled around the track via motors between the cars. Power is carried to the motors via slip ring brushes at the center and cables. 

Only one full-sized Tumble Bug remains operating today in the United States, in Pennsylvania: at Kennywood in West Mifflin.  All full-size instances were made by Traver Engineering, and its successor, R.E.Chambers. The ride also exists in a miniature children's form. The size of the full-size Tumble Bug is 100 feet in diameter. The full-size has 5 or 6 cars, while the kiddie version has 3 to 4 cars. There are more kiddie versions operating today than there are full-sized. The one in Conneaut Lake Park has been removed as of April 2021.

Tumble Bug sites

Operating

Kennywood Park (1927–present) West Mifflin, Pennsylvania, (known as the "Turtle," 6 car model)

Defunct
Cascade Park (1969–??), New Castle, Pennsylvania
Cedar Point (1934–1963), Sandusky, Ohio
Chippewa Lake Park (??–1978), Chippewa Lake, Ohio
Conneaut Lake Park (1925–2019) Conneaut Lake, Pennsylvania, (known as the "Tumble Bug," 5 car model)
Crescent Park (1930s–1979), Riverside, Rhode Island 
Euclid Beach Park (??–1969), Cleveland, Ohio
Geauga Lake (??–1977), Aurora, Ohio
Hersheypark, (1933–1981), Hershey, Pennsylvania, (called "The Bug," replaced by Wave Swinger)(Ride tubs sold to Whalom Park)
Idora Park (1941–1984), Youngstown, Ohio, (known as the "Turtle," 5 car model)
Coney Island (1925–1971) / Kings Island (1972–1985), Mason, Ohio. Moved from Coney Island (Cincinnati) to Kings Island. Sold to Kennywood Park to use for parts on their Tumble Bug.
San Souci Park, Hanover Township, Luzerne County, Pennsylvania
Seabreeze (1926-1970), Rochester, New York
West View Park (1929–1977), West View, Pennsylvania
Whalom Park (??–2000), Lunenburg, Massachusetts,  (Moved to Edaville USA, Carver, Massachusetts in mid-late 2000s, never operated at Edaville. Sold for scrap metal in 2010)

References 

Amusement rides